Brazos is the moniker of Martin McNulty Crane. Originally from Austin, Texas, Brazos gained recognition in 2009 with the self-released debut album, "Phosphorescent Blues". He and the band are currently based in Brooklyn, New York.

Overview

Brazos began as the solo recording project of songwriter Martin Crane, who debuted the band late 2007 with the EPs Feeding Frenzy and A City Just as Tall. Brazos, in its original incarnation, went on to open for Grizzly Bear, Shearwater, Vampire Weekend, The National, Iron & Wine, Wye Oak and Bowerbirds, as well as a national tour with local pals, White Denim.

Phosphorescent Blues was self released in 2009 to positive reviews but after touring took its toll, Crane "packed everything he owned into a 1990 Honda Civic station wagon that he'd had since he was 15 and moved to New York." and signed to Dead Oceans.

With new bandmates Spencer Zahn (bass) (who moonlights in Empress Of's band) and Ian Chang (drums) in tow, the band working on its Dead Oceans debut which ultimately became Saltwater which saw international release May 28, 2013.

Discography

Albums

EP / Other Releases

References

External links
 
 

Indie rock musical groups from Texas
Musical groups from Austin, Texas
Dead Oceans artists